The seventieth Minnesota Legislature first convened on January 4, 1977. The 67 members of the Minnesota Senate and the 134 members of the Minnesota House of Representatives were elected during the General Election of November 2, 1976. It was the first Minnesota Legislature since the thirty-eighth Minnesota Legislature whose members of the Minnesota Senate were chosen in partisan elections.

Sessions 
The legislature met in a regular session from January 4, 1977 to May 23, 1977. A continuation of the regular session was held between January 17, 1978 and March 24, 1978. There were no special sessions of the 70th Legislature.

Party summary 
Resignations and new members are discussed in the "Membership changes" section, below.

Senate

House of Representatives

Leadership

Senate 
President of the Senate
Edward J. Gearty (DFL-Minneapolis)

Senate Majority Leader
Nicholas D. Coleman (DFL-Saint Paul)

Senate Minority Leader
Robert O. Ashbach (IR-St. Paul)

House of Representatives 
Speaker of the House
Martin O. Sabo (DFL-Minneapolis)

House Majority Leader
Irvin N. Anderson (DFL-International Falls)

House Minority Leader
Henry J. Savelkoul (IR-Albert Lea)

Members

Senate

House of Representatives

Membership changes

Senate

House of Representatives

Notes

References 

 Minnesota Legislators Past & Present - Session Search Results (Session 70, Senate)
 Minnesota Legislators Past & Present - Session Search Results (Session 70, House)

70th
1970s in Minnesota
1977 in Minnesota
1978 in Minnesota
1977 U.S. legislative sessions
1978 U.S. legislative sessions